Pengalila is an 2019 Malayalam–language Indian drama film written and directed by T. V. Chandran. The film portrays the emotional bond between Radha (Baby Akshara Kishor), an 8-year-old girl and Azhagan (Lal), a 65-year-old daily wage worker who comes to clean up the backyard of Radha's house. The film started production in August 2018. It released on 8 March 2019.

Cast

Lal as Azhagan
Akshara Kishore as Radhalekshmi
Narain as Vinod
 Renji Panicker as Koshy Mathew
 Indrans
Ineya as Rekha
 Basil Paulose as Thomas
 Thirunal
 Naushad
 Priyanka Nair
 Telly Sebastian (Played younger age of Lal)
 Neethu Chandran
 Ambili Sunil
Sheela Sasi 
 Marina Michael

References

External links

2010s Malayalam-language films
2019 drama films
2019 films
Films directed by T. V. Chandran
Indian drama films